Kristiina Maria Brask (born 2 June 1990) is a Finnish pop singer. She was a finalist in the third season of Idols in 2007. She was placed third after Ari Koivunen and Anna Abreu.

Soon after Idols participation, Kristiina made a recording contract with Helsinki Music Company. Her debut album, Silmät sydämeeni, was released in November 2007. It has sold more than 15 000 copies (gold). Four singles, "Nyt mä meen", "Silmät sydämeeni", "Pilvet valmiina" and "Liian kaukana", have been released.

Brask's second album, called Kuivilla susta, was released on September 9, 2009.

In addition to music, Brask loves ice hockey. She comes from Sorsakoski, Leppävirta, and studies in a music-based high school in Kuopio.

Discography
Albums
Silmät sydämeeni (7 November 2007)
Kuivilla Susta (9 September 2009)
'SinglesNyt mä meen (10 October 2007)Silmät sydämeeniPilvet valmiinaLiian kaukanaKuivilla Susta* (5 June 2009) Happee, Hoitoo ja Empatiaa''

Filmography

References

External links 
 Kristiina Brask - the official homepage (in Finnish)

1990 births
Living people
21st-century Finnish women singers
Finnish pop singers
Finnish voice actresses
People from Leppävirta